State Highway 14 (SH 14) is a New Zealand state highway in the north of the North Island. It runs to the west coast of the Northland Region of New Zealand.

Route

Major intersections

See also
List of New Zealand state highways
List of roads and highways, for notable or famous roads worldwide

References

External links
New Zealand Transport Agency

14
Transport in the Northland Region